Chilton High School may refer to:

 Chilton High School (Texas) in Chilton, Texas
 Chilton High School (Wisconsin) in Chilton, Wisconsin
 Chilton County High School in Clanton, Alabama